Daniël Sebastiaan "Dany" Tuijnman (16 April 1915 – 25 April 1992) was a Dutch politician of the People's Party for Freedom and Democracy (VVD).

Decorations

References

External links

Official
  Ir. D.S. (Dany) Tuijnman Parlement & Politiek

 

 

1915 births
1992 deaths
Commanders of the Order of Orange-Nassau
Dutch agronomists
Dutch members of the Dutch Reformed Church
Dutch trade union leaders
Knights of the Order of the Netherlands Lion
Ministers of Housing and Spatial Planning of the Netherlands
Ministers of Transport and Water Management of the Netherlands
Members of the House of Representatives (Netherlands)
People's Party for Freedom and Democracy politicians
People from Driebergen-Rijsenburg
People from Middelburg, Zeeland
Wageningen University and Research alumni
20th-century Dutch engineers
20th-century Dutch politicians
20th-century agronomists